Jim Dutcher (born 1943), is an American naturalist, cinematographer, director and author. He has written eight books and produced three wildlife films about wolves.  Jim and his wife, Jamie Dutcher, are the creators of the two-time Emmy winning documentary, Wolves at Our Door, and founders of the non-profit organization, Living with Wolves. The Dutcher's are recognized as two of America's most knowledgeable experts on wolves.

Career 

In 1962, Jim Dutcher began his career as an underwater cinematographer, and then as a wildlife film producer for National Geographic, a dream he had pursued since childhood. His early experiences with a camera were spent underwater on the Florida coast. In 1985, his first television film, Water, Birth, the Planet Earth, began a career spent with animals that range from tiny hatchling sea turtles to one of the top ranking predators in North America – the wolf.  Combining extraordinary camera work and the trust he gains from his subjects, Jim’s films take audiences into a world never before filmed: inside beaver lodges, down burrows to observe wolf pups, and into the life of a mother mountain lion as she cares for her newborn kittens. His work includes the National Geographic special A Rocky Mountain Beaver Pond, and ABC World of Discovery’s two highest-rated films, Cougar: Ghost of the Rockies and Wolf: Return of a Legend.

During the 1990s, Jim began a film project in the Sawtooth Mountains of Idaho with the now-famous Sawtooth Pack. Determined to overcome deadly misperceptions about wolves, Jim and his wife, Jamie Dutcher, camped in the wilderness observing the wolves' social hierarchy, recording their vocalizations, filming their activities, and earning their trust. What they discovered were animals devoted to one another, capable of emotional bonds and affection resembling those of human families. Their six-year experience led to the creation of the National Geographic Society book The Hidden Life of Wolves as well as seven other books and three prime-time television documentaries on wolves. With more than 30 years of their lives devoted to eradicating ancient myths surrounding wolves, they remain dedicated to sharing their unique and personal eye-witness knowledge.

In 1991, Jim received the prestigious Wrangler Award for his cougar documentary from the National Cowboy Hall of Fame. In 1995, the Governor of Idaho appointed Jim as an ex officio member of the Idaho Wolf Management Committee, where he served until 2001. As part of the wolf reintroduction initiative at Yellowstone National Park in 1994, Jim served as a consultant for the design of pack holding enclosures, and as a specialist in the handling of the reintroduced wolves brought from Canada. The Dutcher's also led three National Geographic expeditions to Alaska, working with the late revered wolf biologist Dr. Gordon Haber, observing pack hunting techniques and the culture of shared knowledge within individual wolf families.

In 2005, moved by the plight of wolves, the Dutchers put down their filmmaking equipment and founded the national nonprofit organization, Living with Wolves, seeking to re-establish the wolf in its rightful place in the American West. Since then, they have presented trusted factual information in multimedia presentations, books, films, educator guides for schools, social media, and museum exhibits as they continue to promote understanding of this persecuted species by sharing their knowledge and lifetime of study. Living with Wolves has become a premier advocate for wolves, reaching more than 30 million people worldwide.

Filmography

Awards 

Working together, Jim and Jamie Dutcher created two of Discovery Channel’s highest rated wildlife films, Wolves at Our Door and Living with Wolves. Their television specials on wolves have won three Prime-Time Emmys, for Cinematography, for Outstanding Programming and for Sound Recording.

Bibliography

 Dutcher, J., & Ballantine, R. (1996). The Sawtooth Wolves. New York: Rufus Publications, Inc. 
 Dutcher, J., Dutcher, J., & Manfull, J. (2002). Wolves at Our Door: The Extraordinary Story of the Couple Who Lived with Wolves. New York: Pocket Books. 
 Dutcher, J., & Dutcher, J. (2004). Living with Wolves. Seattle, WA: Mountaineers Books. 
 Dutcher, J., Dutcher, J., Manfull, J., & Redford, R. (2013). The Hidden Life of Wolves. Washington, D.C.: National Geographic. 
 Dutcher, J., & Dutcher, J. (2015). A Friend for Lakota: The Incredible True Story of a Wolf Who Braved Bullying. Washington, D.C: National Geographic Kids. 
 Dutcher, J., & Dutcher, J. (2016). Living with Wolves. Washington, D.C.: National Geographic Kids. 
 Dutcher, J., & Dutcher, J., with Manfull, J. (2018). The Wisdom of Wolves: Lessons from the Sawtooth Pack. Washington, D.C.: National Geographic Books. 
 Dutcher, J., & Dutcher, J. (2019). Running with Wolves. Washington, D.C.: National Geographic Books.

References

External links 
 Living with Wolves Home Page
 
 
 NPR interview with Jim and Jamie Dutcher

1943 births
Living people
American documentary filmmakers
Primetime Emmy Award winners